Five Minutes to a Fortune is a British game show, which aired on Channel 4 from 6 April 2013 to 5 May 2013 and was hosted by Davina McCall. It offered pairs of contestants the chance to win a top prize of £50,000 (or £100,000 for celebrity specials). The show aired weekdays at 5:00pm but was unable to generate high ratings to compete with ITV's The Chase and BBC's Pointless, both of which air roughly in the same timeslot.

Format
In the studio stands a  hourglass filled with tokens that represent an initial prize pot of £50,000. At the start of the game, the two contestants each decide which role they will play. One is the "Game Player" and must play through five rounds; the other is the "Time Keeper," responsible for deciding how much time the Game Player will have to complete each round before the prize pot begins to decrease. In addition, the Time Keeper chooses the category for each round. Seven vague categories are presented at the start of the game, such as Animal Lover, Couch Potato, Film/History Buff, Trivia Junkie, and Wordsmith; categories are removed from the list as they are used. The Time Keeper is given a total of five minutes to allot over the five rounds, and is advised to give more time to categories that may pose a challenge to the Game Player.

Gameplay
In each round, the Game Player must give five correct answers. Once the Time Keeper chooses a category, an example of the specific game to be played (27 in all during the first series) is shown to both contestants, after which the Time Keeper sets the time limit. Frequently, the Game Player must respond in an unconventional manner, such as spelling the answer backwards or by using the numbers on a touch-tone telephone keypad. He/she may pass as often as desired, but as there is a limited bank of questions for each round, passing too often will eventually cause the questions to cycle. The Game Player may guess on any question as many times as desired, but can move on to a new one only by giving the correct answer or passing. Answers to any passed questions are revealed once the round is complete.

If the Game Player reaches the final 10 seconds of the time allotted by the Time Keeper, the hourglass begins to flip. Once time runs out, the tokens start to drain into the lower section and the prize pot begins to decrease accordingly, at a steady rate of £625 every three seconds (£12,500 per minute). The round continues until either the Game Player gives a fifth correct answer or the hourglass has completely emptied. In the former case, the draining stops as soon as the answer is given; in the latter case, the Game Player "crashes out," the game ends, and the contestants leave with no money. If the Game Player completes the round within the allotted time, the prize pot remains intact but any extra time remaining on the clock is lost.

The two contestants may not confer at any time once they have chosen their roles. Once during the game, the Time Keeper may press an Emergency Stop button to halt a round if the Game Player is struggling badly. The current category is thrown out, and the Game Player plays a makeup round (the "Emergency Game") using a category randomly chosen from the ones still in play. The Game Player has the same time limit for the Emergency Game as he/she had for the one stopped by the Time Keeper, but this time is not deducted from the team's overall five-minute allotment. Money drained during the stopped game is not replaced in the hourglass.

At the end of each round, the drained money is counted and removed from the hourglass, and the remainder is kept in play for the next round.

Final game
After the fifth round, the Time Keeper plays one last game, choosing one of the two remaining categories (or the last one if the Emergency Stop has been used) and with no help from the Game Player. The Time Keeper is shown the heading of a list with 10 hidden answers, and the hourglass begins to turn once the heading has been read aloud. (E.g. "The first 10 children's books written by Roald Dahl.") After 10 seconds of play, money begins to drain at the same rate as in the previous rounds. If the Time Keeper names any five of the hidden answers before the hourglass is empty, the draining stops and the contestants split the remaining money. If not, they leave with nothing.

Celebrity episodes
Five episodes were filmed with pairs of celebrities competing on behalf of selected charities. The initial prize pot for these episodes was doubled to £100,000, and the money draining rate was also doubled to £1,250 every three seconds (£25,000 per minute).

Production
The show is recorded in Studio 8 at BBC Television Centre. Contestant auditions took place in London, Cardiff, Birmingham, Manchester, Newcastle and Edinburgh.

The hourglass is the creation of Julian Healy and Scott Fleary.

International versions
The French channel TF1 is the first international broadcaster to launch a local format of the show. It will be called Pas une seconde à perdre! (Not a second to lose!) and hosted by Estelle Denis and Gérard Vives. In this version, the hourglass will contain €25,000 and it will premiere at the end of January 2014.

Legend:
 Currently airing  
 No longer airing  
 Upcoming version

See also
Take On the Twisters, another 2013 British game show based around the use of an hourglass.

References

External links
 
 
 

2013 British television series debuts
2013 British television series endings
Channel 4 game shows
2010s British game shows
Television series by Sony Pictures Television